SS Alcoa Puritan may refer to:

 , a Type C1-B ship launched in 1941; sunk in May 1942 by 
 , a Type C1-B ship launched in 1943; scrapped in 1965

Alcoa
Ship names